The Amazon Kindle e-book reader DRM system uses the PC1 cipher, also called the Kindle cipher or Pukall cipher 1.

History 
The PC1 cipher was designed by Alexander Pukall in 1991.

References

External links
 The PC1 Encryption Algorithm
 The PC1 Encryption Algorithm

Block ciphers
Digital rights management